The Raes was a Canadian variety television series which aired on CBC Television from 30 June 1978 to 1 April 1980.

Premise
Robbie and Cherrill Rae, a husband-and-wife singing duo, hosted this entertainment series featuring the Tommy Banks orchestra, Jeff Hyslop's choreography and the James Hibbard Dancers. The series featured international musical guests combined with Canadian musicians and also included comedy segments starring Lally Cadeau as a wardrobe director and Jackson Davies portraying a television director. The series was recorded with a studio audience at CBC-TV Studios in Vancouver, British Columbia.

Scheduling
The show's initial run was an hour-long mid-season series titled The Raes Variety Hour on Fridays at 9:00 p.m. from 30 June to 25 August 1978. The following year, it ran for a regular season as half-hour episodes under the shortened title The Raes on Tuesdays at 8:30 p.m. from 11 September 1979 to 1 April 1980.

Episode list

Season 1 – The Raes Variety Hour (1978)

Season 2 – The Raes (1979–1980)

References

External links
 The Raes episode guide at TVarchive.ca
 

1978 Canadian television series debuts
1980 Canadian television series endings
1970s Canadian variety television series
1980s Canadian variety television series
1970s Canadian music television series
1980s Canadian music television series
CBC Television original programming
Television shows filmed in Vancouver